The Old Lapau, formerly known as the Lapau, is a historical building in Bandar Seri Begawan, Brunei. It was the former  or royal ceremonial hall prior to the existence of the current Lapau building. It was also where the Constitution of Brunei was promulgated in 1959. It now houses a museum pertaining to the Constitution.

Building 
The building is located at Jalan James Pearce in Pusat Bandar, the city centre of Bandar Seri Begawan. It is now part of the Brunei History Centre building and adjacent to the Ministry of Home Affairs.

It was built during the reign of Sultan Omar Ali Saifuddien III, the 28th Sultan of Brunei. The building eventually could not accommodate the growing capacity and a new  building was built which effectively replaced the existing building from 1968 until today.

Since September 2018 the building now houses the 1959 Brunei Constitution Gallery, a museum which showcases visual information on the Constitution of Brunei which was promulgated in the very building on 29 September 1959.

The building has been officially designated as a historic site under the Antiquities and Treasure Trove Act of Brunei.

References

External links 
 

Lapau, Old
Historic sites in Brunei